"Stand by Me" is a song by English singer John Newman. The song was released as a digital download on 6 March 2020 by Island Records. The song peaked at number 24 on the Scottish Singles Chart. The song was written by KIDDO, Fredrik Haggstam, John Newman and Litens Anton Nilsson.

Track listing

Personnel
Credits adapted from Tidal.
 Steve Mac – producer, keyboards
 Emma Bertilsson – composer, lyricist
 Fredrik Haggstam – composer, lyricist
 John Newman – composer, lyricist, vocals
 Litens Anton Nilsson – composer, lyricist
 Cherice Kirton – background vocalist
 David Francis – background vocalist
 Emily Holligan – background vocalist
 Trevor Francis – background vocalist
 Chris Laurence – bass
 Richard Pryce – bass
 Steve Pearce – bass guitar
 Caroline Day – cello
 Martin Loveday – cello
 Nick Cooper – cello
 Tony Woollard – cello
 Abbey Ennis – clapping
 Chris Laws – drum programming, recording engineer, studio personnel
 Carlos Garcia – guitar
 Freddy Alexander – guitar
 Phil Tan – mixer, studio personnel
 David Arch – orchestra leader
 Dann Pursey – percussion, recording engineer, studio personnel

Charts

Release history

References

2020 singles
2020 songs
Island Records singles
John Newman (singer) songs